Phet Utong Or. Kwanmuang (born 11 February 1995) is a Thai Muay Thai fighter, from Buriram Province, in the Northeast region of Thailand.

Biography and career
Phet Utong started training Muay Thai at the age of 6 at the Sor Thaveekit camp owned by his father. He moved to Bangkok at the age of 14 and joined the Sor Sommai Gym.

Phet Utong is a two-time Rajadamnern Stadium Super Featherweight champion, winning the first title against Superlek Kiatmuu9 in 2016 and the second time in 2017 against Kaonar P.K.SaenchaiMuaythaiGym.

In November 2018, Phet Utong Or. Kwanmuang was ranked the #9 Super-feather weight ranked on Rajadamnern Stadium by muaythai2000.com.

In December 2018, Phet Utong was ranked the #10 Super-feather weight on Lumpinee Stadium by muaythai2000.com.

In October 2019, Phet Utong was ranked the #8 Super-feather weight in Rajadamnern Stadium by muaythai2000.com. He was also ranked the #4 Super-feather weight in Lumpinee Stadium by muaythai2000.com.

Titles and accomplishments
2017 Rajadamnern Stadium Super-FeatherWeight Champion (130 lbs)
2016 Sports Writers Association of Thailand Fighter of the Year
2016 Rajadamnern Stadium Super Featherweight Champion (130 lbs)

Fight record

|-  style="background:#fbb"
| 2023-01-09 || Loss ||align=left| Superball Tded99 || Muay Thai Pantamit || Chiang Rai province, Thailand || KO (Low kicks)|| 3 ||
|-  style="background:#cfc"
| 2022-11-23 || Win ||align=left| Taksila Chor.Hapayak || Muay Thai Palangmai, Rajadamnern Stadium || Bangkok, Thailand || KO || 3 ||
|-  style="background:#fbb"
| 2022-09-23 || Loss||align=left| Lobo PhuketFightClub || Muay Thai Lumpinee Pitaktam, Lumpinee Stadium || Bangkok, Thailand || KO (Elbow)|| 2 ||
|-  style="background:#fbb"
| 2022-08-10 || Loss||align=left| Sakunchailek ThePangkongprab|| Muaythai Palangmai, Rajadamnern Stadium || Bangkok, Thailand || Decision ||  5||3:00
|-  style="background:#fbb"
| 2022-07-06 || Loss||align=left| Ferrari Fairtex || Muaythai Palangmai, Rajadamnern Stadium || Bangkok, Thailand || TKO (Referee stoppage) || 4 ||
|-  style="background:#cfc;"
| 2022-06-01|| Win ||align=left| Patakthep Parkbangkhakhaw ||Muay Thai Palangmai, Rajadamnern Stadium ||Bangkok, Thailand || Decision || 5 ||3:00

|-  style="background:#cfc;"
| 2022-05-04|| Win ||align=left| Prabsuek Siopol ||Muay Thai Palangmai, Siam Omnoi Stadium ||Samut Sakhon, Thailand || Decision || 5 ||3:00 

|-  style="background:#fbb;"
| 2022-03-11|| Loss||align=left| Siwakorn Kiatcharoenchai || Pitaktham + Sor.Sommai + Palangmai || Songkhla province, Thailand ||  Decision || 5 ||3:00 

|-  style="background:#cfc"
| 2022-01-23|| Win ||align=left| Rambolek Tor.Yotha || Channel 7 Stadium || Bangkok, Thailand || Decision || 5 ||3:00 
|-  style="background:#fbb"
| 2021-11-06|| Loss ||align=left| Siwakorn Kiatcharoenchai || Omnoi Stadium || Samut Sakhon, Thailand || Decision ||5  ||3:00 
|-
! style=background:white colspan=9 |
|-  style="background:#cfc"
| 2021-09-25|| Win ||align=left| Thanonchai Fairtex || Kiatpetch, Lumpinee GoSport Studio || Bangkok, Thailand || Decision || 5 || 3:00 
|-  style="background:#fbb"
| 2020-10-03 || Loss||align=left| Superball Tded99 || Omnoi Stadium || Samut Sakhon, Thailand || Decision || 5|| 3:00
|-  style="background:#cfc"
| 2020-02-28 ||Win ||align=left| Rungkit Wor.Sanprapai || Ruamponkonchon Pratan Super Fight || Pathum Thani, Thailand || Decision|| 5||3:00
|-  style="background:#CCFFCC;"
| 2019-12-23|| Win ||align=left| Panpayak Sitchefboontham || Rajadamnern Stadium || Bangkok, Thailand || Decision || 5 || 3:00
|-  style="background:#CCFFCC;"
| 2019-10-10|| Win ||align=left| Rangkhao Wor.Sangprapai || Rajadamnern Stadium || Bangkok, Thailand || Decision || 5 || 3:00
|-  style="background:#fbb;"
| 2019-07-18 || Loss ||align=left| Mongkolpetch Petchyindee || Rajadamnern Stadium || Bangkok, Thailand || Decision || 5 || 3:00
|-  style="background:#fbb;"
| 2019-05-29 || Loss ||align=left| Rungkit Wor.Sanprapai || Rajadamnern Stadium || Bangkok, Thailand || TKO (Low Kick)|| 3 ||
|-  style="background:#CCFFCC;"
| 2019-04-30|| Win ||align=left| Suakim PK Saenchaimuaythaigym || Lumpinee Stadium || Bangkok, Thailand || Decision || 5 || 3:00
|-  style="background:#fbb;"
| 2019-02-07|| Loss ||align=left| Superball Tded99 || Rajadamnern Stadium || Bangkok, Thailand || Decision || 5 || 3:00
|-  style="background:#fbb;"
| 2019-01-10|| Loss ||align=left| Jamsak Supermuay || Rajadamnern Stadium || Bangkok, Thailand || Decision || 5 || 3:00
|-  style="background:#fbb;"
| 2018-12-21|| Loss ||align=left| Superball Tded99 || Rajadamnern Stadium || Bangkok, Thailand || Decision || 5 || 3:00
|-  style="background:#fbb;"
| 2018-11-29|| Loss ||align=left| Superball Tded99 || Rajadamnern Stadium || Bangkok, Thailand || Decision || 5 || 3:00
|-  style="background:#CCFFCC;"
| 2018-11-09|| Win||align=left|  Arthur Meyer|| Best of Siam 14 || France || Decision|| 3 || 3:00
|-  style="background:#CCFFCC;"
| 2018-07-25|| Win||align=left|  Yamin P.K.SaenchaiMuaythaiGym || Rajadamnern Stadium || Bangkok, Thailand || KO (Right High Kick)|| 4 ||
|-  style="background:#c5d2ea;"
| 2018-06-14|| Draw ||align=left| Superlek Kiatmuu9|| Rajadamnern Stadium || Bangkok, Thailand || Decision || 5 || 3:00
|-  style="background:#CCFFCC;"
| 2018-03-22|| Win||align=left|  Extra Sitworrapat  || Rajadamnern Stadium || Bangkok, Thailand || TKO (Referee Stop./Arm Injury)|| 4 ||
|-  style="background:#CCFFCC;"
| 2018-02-20|| Win||align=left|  Phetwason Or.Daokrajai  || Lumpinee Stadium || Bangkok, Thailand || Decision || 5 || 3:00
|-  style="background:#fbb;"
| 2018-01-25|| Loss ||align=left| Superlek Kiatmuu9 || Rajadamnern Stadium || Bangkok, Thailand || Decision || 5 || 3:00
|-  style="background:#CCFFCC;"
| 2017-12-21|| Win||align=left|  Kaonar P.K.SaenchaiMuaythaiGym || Rajadamnern Stadium || Bangkok, Thailand || Decision || 5 || 3:00
|-
! style=background:white colspan=9 |
|-  style="background:#CCFFCC;"
| 2017-09-09 || Win ||align=left| Nuenglanlek Jitmuangnon ||  || Thailand || TKO || 4 ||
|-  style="background:#CCFFCC;"
| 2017-08-07|| Win ||align=left| Theppabuth Sit-Au-Ubon || Rajadamnern Stadium || Bangkok, Thailand || Decision || 5 || 3:00
|-  style="background:#fbb;"
| 2017-06-28|| Loss ||align=left| Kaonar P.K.SaenchaiMuaythaiGym || Rajadamnern Stadium || Bangkok, Thailand || Decision || 5 || 3:00
|-  style="background:#fbb;"
| 2017-05-25|| Loss ||align=left| Panpayak Sitjatik || Rajadamnern Stadium || Bangkok, Thailand || KO (Left Elbow)|| 3 ||
|-  style="background:#fbb;"
| 2017-04-06|| Loss ||align=left| Panpayak Jitmuangnon || Rajadamnern Stadium || Bangkok, Thailand || Decision || 5 || 3:00
|-  style="background:#CCFFCC;"
| 2017-03-02|| Win ||align=left| Panpayak Jitmuangnon || Rajadamnern Stadium || Bangkok, Thailand || TKO (Referee Stoppage/Right Hook) || 1 ||
|-  style="background:#CCFFCC;"
| 2017-02-02|| Win ||align=left| Kaimukkao Por.Thairongruangkamai|| Rajadamnern Stadium || Bangkok, Thailand || KO ( Right Elbow)|| 2 ||
|-  style="background:#CCFFCC;"
| 2016-12-22|| Win ||align=left| Superlek Kiatmuu9  || Rajadamnern Stadium || Bangkok, Thailand || Decision || 5 || 3:00
|-
! style=background:white colspan=9 |
|-  style="background:#CCFFCC;"
| 2016-09-29|| Win ||align=left| Kaewkungwan Piwwayo || Rajadamnern Stadium || Bangkok, Thailand || Decision || 5 || 3:00
|-  style="background:#CCFFCC;"
| 2016-07-18|| Win ||align=left| Bangpleenoi 96Penang || Rajadamnern Stadium || Bangkok, Thailand || Decision || 5 || 3:00
|-  style="background:#CCFFCC;"
| 2016-04-29|| Win ||align=left| Saen Parunchai|| Lumpinee Stadium || Bangkok, Thailand || KO (Right Uppercut) || 3 ||
|-  style="background:#CCFFCC;"
| 2016-03-10|| Win ||align=left| Panpayak Sitjatik || Rajadamnern Stadium || Bangkok, Thailand || Decision || 5 || 3:00
|-  style="background:#fbb;"
| 2016-01-29|| Loss ||align=left| Panpayak Sitjatik || Rajadamnern Stadium || Bangkok, Thailand || Decision || 5 || 3:00
|-  style="background:#fbb;"
| 2015-11-19|| Loss ||align=left| Thanonchai Thanakorngym  ||  Rajadamnern Stadium || Bangkok, Thailand || KO (Left Cross) || 3  ||
|-  style="background:#fbb;"
| 2015-10-14|| Loss ||align=left| Muangthai PKSaenchaimuaythaigym  || Onesongchai Anniversary Show, Rajadamnern Stadium || Bangkok, Thailand || KO (Right Upper Elbow)|| 3 || 2:18
|-  style="background:#fbb;"
| 2015-09-10|| Loss ||align=left| Thanonchai Thanakorngym  ||  Rajadamnern Stadium || Bangkok, Thailand || Decision || 5 || 3:00
|-  style="background:#CCFFCC;"
| 2015-07-15|| Win ||align=left| Superlek Kiatmuu9  || Rajadamnern Stadium || Bangkok, Thailand || Decision || 5 || 3:00
|-  style="background:#fbb;"
| 2015-06-04 || Loss ||align=left| Sangmanee Sor Tienpo || Rajadamnern Stadium || Bangkok, Thailand || Decision || 5 || 3:00
|-  style="background:#CCFFCC;"
| 2015-05-07|| Win ||align=left| Thaksinlek Kiatniwat  || Rajadamnern Stadium || Bangkok, Thailand || Decision || 5 || 3:00
|-  style="background:#fbb;"
| 2015-03-30 || Loss ||align=left| Sangmanee Sor Tienpo || Rajadamnern Stadium || Bangkok, Thailand || Decision || 5 || 3:00
|-  style="background:#CCFFCC;"
| 2015-02-12 || Win ||align=left| Thaksinlek Kiatniwat || Rajadamnern Stadium || Bangkok, Thailand || KO (Left Hook)|| 4 ||
|-  style="background:#CCFFCC;"
| 2014-12-24|| Win ||align=left| Yokwithaya Petchsimuan  || Rajadamnern Stadium || Bangkok, Thailand || Decision || 5 || 3:00
|-  style="background:#fbb;"
| 2014-11-25|| Loss ||align=left| Kwankhao Mor.Ratanabandit || Lumpinee Stadium || Bangkok, Thailand || Decision || 5 || 3:00
|-  style="background:#CCFFCC;"
| 2014-10-28|| Win ||align=left| Superlek Kiatmuu9  || Lumpinee Stadium || Bangkok, Thailand || TKO (Doctor Stoppage/Cut)|| 4 || 1:49
|-  style="background:#CCFFCC;"
| 2014-10-08 || Win||align=left| Singtongnoi Por.Telakun || Rajadamnern Stadium || Bangkok, Thailand || TKO || 3||
|-  style="background:#fbb;"
| 2014-05-02 || Loss ||align=left| Songkom Sakhomsin || Lumpinee Stadium || Bangkok, Thailand || Decision || 5 || 3:00
|-  style="background:#fbb;"
| 2013-10-29 || Loss ||align=left| Phetmorakot Petchyindee Academy || Lumpinee Stadium || Bangkok, Thailand || Decision || 5 || 3:00
|-  style="background:#CCFFCC;"
| 2013-09-11 || Win||align=left| Superbank Mor Ratanabandit || Rajadamnern Stadium || Bangkok, Thailand || Decision || 5|| 3:00
|-  style="background:#CCFFCC;"
| 2013-08-15 || Win||align=left|  Nongbeer Chokngamwong || Lumpinee Stadium || Bangkok, Thailand || Decision || 5|| 3:00
|-  style="background:#CCFFCC;"
| 2013-07-12 || Win||align=left|  Nongbeer Chokngamwong || Lumpinee Stadium || Bangkok, Thailand || Decision || 5|| 3:00
|-  style="background:#fbb;"
| 2013-06-07 || Loss||align=left| Sam-A Kaiyanghadaogym|| Lumpinee Stadium || Bangkok, Thailand || TKO (Low kick) || 2 ||
|-  style="background:#CCFFCC;"
| 2013-05-17 || Win||align=left| Nongbeer Chokngamwong || Lumpinee Stadium || Bangkok, Thailand || Decision || 5|| 3:00
|-  style="background:#fbb;"
| 2013-04-09 ||Loss ||align=left| Sam-A Kaiyanghadaogym || Lumpinee Stadium || Bangkok, Thailand || Decision || 5 || 3:00
|-  style="background:#CCFFCC;"
| 2013-03-07 || Win||align=left| Phetmorakot Petchyindee Academy || Rajadamnern Stadium || Bangkok, Thailand || Decision || 5 || 3:00
|-  style="background:#CCFFCC;"
| 2013-02-05 || Win||align=left| Mongkolchai Kwaitonggym || Lumpinee Stadium || Bangkok, Thailand || Decision || 5 || 3:00
|-  style="background:#fbb;"
| 2012-12-24||Loss ||align=left| Kaotam Lookprabaht || Lumpinee Stadium || Bangkok, Thailand || Decision || 5 || 3:00
|-  style="background:#c5d2ea;"
| 2012-10-11|| Draw ||align=left| Yodtongthai Por.Telakoon|| Rajadamnern Stadium || Bangkok, Thailand || Decision || 5 || 3:00
|-  style="background:#CCFFCC;"
| 2012-09-18 || Win||align=left| Luknimit Singklongsi || Lumpinee Stadium || Bangkok, Thailand || Decision || 5 || 3:00
|-  style="background:#CCFFCC;"
| 2012-08-08 || Win||align=left| Auisiewpor Sujibamikiew || Rajadamnern Stadium || Bangkok, Thailand || Decision || 5 || 3:00
|-  style="background:#CCFFCC;"
| 2012-07-17 || Win||align=left| Tiankhao Tor.Sangtiennoi || Lumpinee Stadium || Bangkok, Thailand || Decision || 5 || 3:00
|-  style="background:#fbb;"
| 2012-05-17||Loss ||align=left| Dung Sor.Ploernjit || Rajadamnern Stadium || Bangkok, Thailand || Decision || 5 || 3:00
|-
| colspan=9 | Legend:

References

PhetUtong Or.Kwanmuang
Living people
1995 births
PhetUtong Or.Kwanmuang